Geraldine Joslyn Fraser-Moleketi (born 24 August 1960) is a South African politician who was Minister of Public Service and Administration since 17 June 1999 to 25 September 2008. She was also a member of the National Executive Committee of the African National Congress until 2007.

Birth and teenage years

She was born in Cape Town on 24 August 1960, the eldest of the six children of Cynthia, a factory worker, and Arthur Fraser, a teacher working at specialized schools in the Cape Peninsula.

Fraser spent her formative years with her maternal grandmother who lives in the small Klipfontein community adjacent to Cape Town's sprawling squatter camp, Crossroads. Her outlook on life was shaped by the beliefs of her grandmother who was an active trade unionist.

Politics further impacted on her family life. Fraser was eight years old when her mother's sister, whose husband was active in the Non-European Unity Movement, left the country to assume a life in exile. By the time she reached Standard 8 Fraser had developed a keen political awareness. At this stage she attended Livingstone High School.

Education

Fraser-Moleketi matriculated from Livingstone High School in Claremont which had a history of providing its pupils with alternative perspective on South African history and socio-political issues. Years of apartheid on Cape Town buses, where half the bus was reserved for whites, had also sharpened her political perspective and Fraser recalls battles with white school children on municipal buses traveling to and from school. Fraser was also influenced by events in and around Cape Town, such as the bulldozing of shacks in Crossroads in the early 1970s, the 1976 school protests and the Fatti's and Monis strike and consumer boycott. Racial tension between the Coloured and the African Communities residing in the emerging settlements was also on the increase. Fraser stepped forward in an attempt to resolve these tensions.

She holds a Masters in Administration from the University of Pretoria.

Political activity

In 1980 while in her second year at the University of the Western Cape, she left South Africa to go into exile in Zimbabwe. Fraser-Moleketi was elected to the South African Communist Party's Central Committee in 1988. She returned to South Africa in July 1990 when the Communist Party was unbanned and helped set up their national offices.

Following the resignation of President Thabo Mbeki in September 2008, Fraser-Moleketi was one of ten ministers who submitted their resignations on 23 September, although it was subsequently announced that she might be willing to remain in her post. This was, however, later refuted by her spokesperson and she was replaced by Richard Baloyi on 25 September.

Kemal Dervis of the United Nations Development Programme (UNDP) has recently announced the appointment of Fraser-Moleketi as Democratic Governance Director in UNDP's Bureau for Development Policy (BDP). Fraser-Moleketi assumed her new role on 2 January 2009.

Husband

She is married to Jabu Moleketi whom she met in a military training camp in Lusaka.

References

 "Who is Who in South African Politics," by Shelagh Gastrow, 1995, Rovan Press, Johannesburg,

1960 births
Living people
Politicians from Cape Town
Cape Coloureds
Members of the National Assembly of South Africa
University of the Western Cape alumni
University of Pretoria alumni
Alumni of Livingstone High School
South African Communist Party politicians
African National Congress politicians
Government ministers of South Africa
Women government ministers of South Africa
Women members of the National Assembly of South Africa